C. E. Corley House is a historic home located near Lexington, Lexington County, South Carolina. It was built about 1895, and is a Queen Anne style dwelling consisting of a two-story, "L"-shaped main block with a single story rear ell. It has a gable roof and weatherboard siding. It features a one-story porch in the turn of the “L” with a gabled and pedimented projecting porch entry.  The porch has an attached gazebo under a conical roof.  The house also has a semicircular bay.  Also on the property is a smokehouse, woodshed, and tenant house.

It was listed on the National Register of Historic Places in 1983.

References

Houses on the National Register of Historic Places in South Carolina
Queen Anne architecture in South Carolina
Houses completed in 1895
Houses in Lexington County, South Carolina
National Register of Historic Places in Lexington County, South Carolina